Allyl iodide (3-iodopropene) is an organic halide used in synthesis of other organic compounds such as N-alkyl-2-pyrrolidones, sorbic acid esters, 5,5-disubstituted barbituric acids, and organometallic catalysts. Allyl iodide can be synthesized from allyl alcohol and methyl iodide on triphenyl phosphite, Finkelstein reaction on allyl halides, or by the action of elemental phosphorus and iodine on glycerol. Allyl iodide dissolved in hexane can be stored for up to three months in a dark freezer at  before decomposition into free iodine becomes apparent.

See also 
 Allyl
 Allyl alcohol
 Allyl bromide
 Allyl chloride

References

Organoiodides
Allyl compounds